Bennetts is a surname. Notable people with the surname include:

Colin Bennetts (1940–2013), British Anglican bishop
Harold William Bennetts (1898–1970), Australian veterinarian
Keanan Bennetts (born 1999), English footballer
Peter Bennetts (born 1967), Australian artist

See also
Bennett (disambiguation)